Javier Enrique "Kike" Delgado Saverio (born 19 June 1999) is a professional footballer who plays as a winger for Spanish club Deportivo de La Coruña.

Club career

Barcelona
Born in Genoa to Ecuadorian parents, Saverio moved to Balzar, Ecuador as an infant, before moving to Barcelona at the age of five. He joined FC Barcelona's La Masia in 2015, from UE Cornellà. 

On 12 July 2018, Saverio renewed his contract until 2020, with a release clause of €50 million, being subsequently promoted to the reserves in Segunda División B. He made his senior debut on 26 August of that year, coming on as a second-half substitute for goalscorer Ballou Tabla in a 1–3 loss at CD Alcoyano.

Saverio scored his first senior goal on 29 September 2018, netting the opener in a 2–1 home success over UE Olot. In October, however, he suffered an injury in his left leg, being sidelined for four months.

On 30 June 2020, Saverio left Barça as his contract expired.

Osasuna
On 16 September 2020, Saverio signed a three-year contract with CA Osasuna, being initially assigned to the B-team in the third division. He made his debut on 25 October, starting in a 0–2 loss at CD Tudelano.

Saverio made his first team debut on 15 December 2020, starting and scoring his team's fourth in a 6–0 away routing of UD Tomares, for the season's Copa del Rey.

Loan to Andorra
On 1 February 2021, Saverio joined third tier side FC Andorra on loan until the end of the season.

Loan to Ponferradina
On 28 July 2021, Saverio moved to Segunda División side SD Ponferradina on a one-year loan deal. He made his professional debut on 22 August, replacing goalscorer José Naranjo in a 1–0 away win over SD Eibar.

On 7 May 2022, after scoring Ponfes third goal in a 3–1 home win over Burgos CF (which was his first professional goal), Saverio suffered an Achilles tendon injury, being sidelined for the remainder of the season.

Deportivo La Coruña
On 21 January 2023, Saverio signed to Primera Federación side Deportivo La Coruña on a two-and-a-half year contract.

International career
Eligible to represent Italy, Ecuador and Spain, Saverio made his debut for the latter's under-19s on 14 November 2017, in a 1–2 loss at Portugal. In 2019, he was called up to the Ecuador under-20 squad for trainings ahead of the 2019 FIFA U-20 World Cup, but did not make the final squad.

Career statistics

Club

Honours
Barcelona
UEFA Youth League: 2017–18

References

External links

1999 births
Living people
Spanish people of Ecuadorian descent
Sportspeople of Ecuadorian descent
Italian people of Ecuadorian descent
Italian emigrants to Spain
Footballers from Genoa
Footballers from Barcelona
Spanish footballers
Ecuadorian footballers
Italian footballers
Association football wingers
Segunda División players
Segunda División B players
FC Barcelona Atlètic players
CA Osasuna B players
CA Osasuna players
FC Andorra players
SD Ponferradina players
Deportivo de La Coruña players
Spanish expatriate footballers
Spanish expatriate sportspeople in Andorra
Expatriate footballers in Andorra
Spain youth international footballers